Cape Decision is a lighthouse located on Kuiu Island adjacent to Sumner Strait in Southeast Alaska.

History
The first attempt to light these waters was an acetylene lantern placed on the Spanish Islands, just off the southern end of Kuiu Island. The lantern was proved ineffective and consequently Congress appropriated $59,400 in 1929 for a lighthouse and construction began in September of that year. However, weather and inadequate funds delayed the completion of the station until it finally became active in March 1932. The total cost ended up in excess of $150,000. The lighthouse became automated in 1974 and in 1989 fire damaged the tram, dock, boathouse, hoist house, paint shed, and helipad. The original third order Fresnel lens was replaced in 1996 with solar powered aero beacon. The lens is on display in Clausen Museum in the nearby community of Petersburg.

The lighthouse was added to the National Register of Historic Places in 2005.

It is currently an active aid to navigation.  The lighthouse is currently owned and maintained by the Cape Decision Lighthouse Society.

References

External links

Cape Decision Lighthouse Society
Cape Decision Lighthouse at Lighthouse Friends

1932 establishments in Alaska
Art Deco architecture in Alaska
Historic American Engineering Record in Alaska
Historic districts on the National Register of Historic Places in Alaska
Lighthouses completed in 1932
Lighthouses in Unorganized Borough, Alaska
Lighthouses on the National Register of Historic Places in Alaska
Buildings and structures on the National Register of Historic Places in Prince of Wales–Hyder Census Area, Alaska